Sir Keir Rodney Starmer  (born 2 September 1962) is a British politician and barrister who has served as Leader of the Opposition and Leader of the Labour Party since 2020. He has been Member of Parliament (MP) for Holborn and St Pancras since 2015. He was previously Director of Public Prosecutions from 2008 to 2013.

Starmer was born in London and raised in Surrey, where he attended the selective state Reigate Grammar School, which became a private school while he was a student. He graduated with a Bachelor of Laws degree from the University of Leeds in 1985 and gained a postgraduate Bachelor of Civil Law degree at St Edmund Hall at the University of Oxford in 1986. After being called to the Bar, Starmer practised predominantly in criminal defence work, with a particular interest in human rights issues. He was a member of Doughty Street Chambers. He was appointed as Queen's Counsel (QC) in 2002. In 2008, he became Director of Public Prosecutions (DPP) and Head of the Crown Prosecution Service, holding these roles until 2013. On conclusion of his five-year term as DPP, he was appointed Knight Commander of the Order of the Bath (KCB) in the 2014 New Year Honours.

Elected to the House of Commons at the 2015 general election, Starmer became Shadow Minister for Immigration in September 2015, before being appointed in October 2016 as Shadow Secretary of State for Exiting the European Union following the EU membership referendum. Starmer advocated a second referendum on Brexit, saying he would have voted for "Remain".

After Jeremy Corbyn resigned following Labour's defeat at the 2019 general election, Starmer won the 2020 Labour Party leadership election in April.

Early life and education
Starmer was born in Southwark, London, on 2 September 1962. He grew up in the small town of Oxted in Surrey. He was the second of the four children of Josephine, a nurse, and Rodney Starmer, a toolmaker. His mother had Still's disease. His parents were Labour Party supporters, and named him after the party's first parliamentary leader, Keir Hardie. He passed the 11-plus examination and gained entry to Reigate Grammar School, then a voluntary aided selective grammar school. The school was converted into an independent fee-paying school in 1976, while he was a student. Although he was exempt from paying fees until the age of 16, his sixth-form study fees were paid by a bursary he received from the private school's charity. Among his classmates were the musician Norman Cook, alongside whom Starmer took violin lessons, Andrew Cooper, who went on to become a Conservative peer, and future conservative journalist Andrew Sullivan; according to Starmer, he and Sullivan "fought over everything ... Politics, religion. You name it."

In his teenage years, Starmer was active in Labour politics; he was a member of the Labour Party Young Socialists in East Surrey. He was a junior exhibitioner at the Guildhall School of Music and Drama until the age of 18, and played the flute, piano, recorder and violin. Starmer studied law at the University of Leeds, graduating with first class honours and a Bachelor of Laws (LLB) degree in 1985, becoming the first member of his family to graduate. He undertook postgraduate studies at St Edmund Hall, Oxford, graduating from the University of Oxford as a Bachelor of Civil Law (BCL) in 1986. From 1986 to 1987, Starmer edited the radical magazine Socialist Alternatives.

Legal career

Barrister
Starmer became a barrister in 1987 at the Middle Temple, becoming a bencher there in 2009. He served as a legal officer for the campaign group Liberty until 1990. He was a member of Doughty Street Chambers from 1990 onwards, primarily working on human rights issues. He has been called to the bar in several Caribbean countries, where he has defended convicts sentenced to the death penalty. He assisted Helen Steel and David Morris in the McLibel case, in the trial and appeal in English courts, also represented them at the European court. The case was seen as a David and Goliath case; a large team of leading lawyers represented  McDonald's and the legal bills were estimated at £10m.  By contrast Steel and Morris were denied legal aid, they acted on their own with help from lawyers including Starmer.

Starmer was appointed Queen's Counsel on 9 April 2002, aged 39. In the same year, he became joint head of Doughty Street Chambers. Starmer served as a human rights adviser to the Northern Ireland Policing Board and the Association of Chief Police Officers, and was also a member of the Foreign and Commonwealth Office's death penalty advisory panel from 2002 to 2008. He later cited his work on policing in Northern Ireland as being a key influence on his decision to pursue a political career: "Some of the things I thought that needed to change in police services we achieved more quickly than we achieved in strategic litigation ... I came better to understand how you can change by being inside and getting the trust of people". During this time he also marched and authored legal opinions against the Iraq War. In 2007, he was named "QC of the Year" by Chambers and Partners.

Director of Public Prosecutions

In July 2008, Baroness Scotland of Asthal, Attorney General for England and Wales, named Starmer as the new head of the Crown Prosecution Service (CPS) and Director of Public Prosecutions. He took over from Ken Macdonald on 1 November 2008. Macdonald, himself a former defence lawyer, publicly welcomed the appointment. Starmer was considered to be bringing a focus on human rights into the legal system.

Within the first few months of his tenure, Starmer upheld the decision not to prosecute the police officers who had killed Jean Charles de Menezes in a UK High Court appeal lodged by the family. The family then gave up on pursuing charges and nobody has been charged with the death of de Menezes. Later in 2009, when the Conservative Party proposed repealing the Human Rights Act 1998, Starmer defended it as a "clear and basic statement of our citizens' human rights". Liberty and the Liberal Democrats supported Starmer, while the Conservative MP David T. C. Davies suggested he should be dismissed. In the same year, he called for the CPS to modernise by being more open to scrutiny and less reliant on paper files. In 2011, he introduced reforms that included the "first test paperless hearing".

In February 2010, Starmer announced the CPS's decision to prosecute three Labour MPs and a Conservative peer for offences relating to false accounting in the aftermath of the parliamentary expenses scandal. They were all found guilty. In the same year, he supported proposals to legally recognise different degrees of murder. In 2010, and 2012, Starmer said that there was insufficient evidence to prosecute two members of the UK security services for their alleged role in torture overseas; he supported further investigation. In July 2010, Starmer announced the decision not to prosecute the police officer Simon Harwood in relation to the death of Ian Tomlinson; this led to accusations by Tomlinson's family of a police cover-up. After a subsequent inquest found that Tomlinson had been unlawfully killed, Starmer announced that Harwood would be prosecuted for manslaughter. The officer was acquitted by a jury in July 2012 but dismissed from the police that September. In December 2010, Starmer changed the decision process, including requiring his personal approval, to prosecute women who withdraw accusations of rape after a woman was convicted for perverting the course of justice "despite judges' belief that her claim of long-term abuse, intimidation and rape at the hands of her husband was true". He later produced guidelines to prevent women in similar circumstances from being unfairly prosecuted. In 2011, thirteen serving and former police officers were prosecuted for perverting the course of justice in the 1988 murder of Lynette White. The prosecution were unable to provide documents which "could have helped" the defendants, that were claimed to have been destroyed by the police officer leading the case against them. The prosecution made the decision, approved by Starmer, not to offer any further evidence, and the trial collapsed. Starmer ordered a review into the circumstances that had led to the decision and ordered a further review in 2012 when the missing documents were found.

During the 2011 England riots, Starmer prioritised rapid prosecutions of rioters over long sentences, which he later thought had helped to bring "the situation back under control". Later that year, after revelations concerning the undercover police infiltration of environmental campaigns, Starmer ordered a review of related convictions and invited protestors convicted of aggravated trespass to appeal their sentences. Starmer declined to authorise a wider enquiry, after a report from the judge Christopher Rose found the issue to be a result of individual fault rather than a systemic problem.

In February 2012, Starmer announced that Secretary of State for Energy and Climate Change, Chris Huhne, and his former wife, Vicky Pryce, would be prosecuted for perverting the course of justice in R v Huhne. Huhne became the first UK cabinet minister in history to be compelled to resign as a result of criminal proceedings. Starmer had previously said in relation to the case that  there is sufficient evidence we do not shy away from prosecuting politicians". Later that year, he wrote advice for prosecutors, saying that they should consider whether violent protestors organised or prepared for violence, compared to protestors who got "caught up in illegal actions". In the summer of 2012, journalist Nick Cohen published allegations that Starmer was personally responsible for allowing to proceed the prosecution of Paul Chambers in what became known as the "Twitter joke trial". Chambers' conviction of sending a message "of a menacing character" was quashed after a third appeal. The CPS denied that Starmer was behind the decision, saying that it was the responsibility of a Crown Court and was out of Starmer's hands. Later that year, Starmer published a plan for the criminal justice system to better handle cases of female genital mutilation; at the time, the offence had never been successfully prosecuted. At the end of 2012, he published guidance on prosecuting cases of grossly offensive posts on social media that called for caution in prosecuting cases, and considering whether users quickly removed posts or showed remorse.

In 2013, Starmer announced changes to how sexual abuse investigations are handled in the wake of the Jimmy Savile sexual abuse scandal, including a panel to review historic complaints. In the same year, he published a study showing that false reports of rape were rare, saying that the "devastating impact of false allegations" and the perception that they are more common than the data support mean that police forces might adopt what he called a cautious approach that can "lead to injustice for victims" of rape. He also started an inquiry into the cause of a reduction in police reports of rape and domestic abuse. In the same year, he altered guidelines for those improperly claiming benefits enabling them to face ten years in prison under the Fraud Act instead of a maximum of seven years under more specific legislation.

Starmer left office in November 2013, and was replaced by Alison Saunders. Later that month, the Labour Party announced that Starmer would lead an enquiry into changing the law to give further protection to victims in cases of rape and child abuse. On 28 December, he said to BBC News he was "rather enjoying having some free time" and "considering a number of options". There was speculation at the time that he would stand as a Labour Party candidate for the UK Parliament.

Early political career

Member of Parliament
Starmer was selected in December 2014 to be the Labour Party's prospective parliamentary candidate for the Labour UK constituency of Holborn and St Pancras, a safe seat, following the decision of the sitting MP Frank Dobson to retire. Starmer was elected at the 2015 UK general election with a majority of 17,048. He was urged by a number of activists to stand in the 2015 Labour Party leadership election following the resignation of Ed Miliband; he ruled this out, citing his relative lack of political experience. During the campaign, Starmer supported Andy Burnham, who finished second to Jeremy Corbyn, the new Leader of the Labour Party .

Corbyn appointed Starmer to the Shadow Home Secretary ministerial team as Shadow Minister for Immigration, a role from which he resigned as part of the wide June 2016 British shadow cabinet resignations in protest at Corbyn's leadership, along with several other Labour MPs saying that it was "simply untenable now to suggest we can offer an effective opposition without a change of leader".

Shadow Brexit Secretary

Following Corbyn's win in the 2016 Labour Party leadership election in September, Starmer accepted an appointment as Shadow Secretary of State for Exiting the European Union, replacing Emily Thornberry who had held the role concurrently with her continuing position as Shadow Secretary of State for Foreign and Commonwealth Affairs. On taking up the role, Starmer resigned from a consultancy position with the law firm specialising in human rights, Mishcon de Reya, that had acted for Gina Miller in bringing legal proceedings against the government in R (Miller) v Secretary of State for Exiting the European Union.

In his role as Shadow Brexit Secretary, Starmer questioned the government's destination for the UK outside of the European Union (EU), as well as calling for Brexit plans to be made public. On 6 December 2016, the prime minister Theresa May confirmed the publication of Brexit plans, in what some considered a victory for Starmer. He argued that the government would be need to pass a large number of new laws quickly, or risk what he called an "unsustainable legal vacuum", if Britain left the EU without a deal. At the 2018 Labour Party Conference on 25 September, Starmer advocated for a referendum on the Brexit withdrawal agreement, saying that the party "campaigning for a public vote must be an option".

In January 2017, Starmer called for a reform to the EU free movement rules following Brexit and for a "fundamental rethink of immigration rules from start to finish". In his first interview after being appointed to the shadow cabinet, Starmer said that immigration should be reduced after Britain left the EU by "making sure we have the skills in this country". Starmer had told Politico in November 2016 that negotiations with the EU should start on the understanding that there must be "some change" to freedom of movement rules, given that remaining in the EU single market is no longer a reality.

In May 2017, Starmer said that "free movement has to go" but that it was important to allow EU citizens to migrate to the UK once they had a job offer, given the importance of immigration for the UK's economy. Starmer was a supporter of a second referendum on Brexit. This position was included as a Labour Party policy in the party's 2019 UK general election manifesto.

Leadership of the Labour Party 
Following Labour's defeat at the 2019 general election, Corbyn announced that he would stand down as Leader of the Labour Party. Starmer announced his candidacy in the ensuing leadership election on 4 January 2020, winning endorsements from MPs, as well as from the trade union Unison. Starmer won the 2020 labour leadership contest on 4 April 2020, beating Long-Bailey and Nandy, with 56.2% of the vote in the first round, and became Leader of the Opposition.

Political positions

Relationship to socialism 
Starmer wrote articles for the magazines Socialist Alternatives and Socialist Lawyer as a young man in the 1980s and 1990s. In July 1986, Starmer wrote in the first issue of Socialist Alternatives that trade unions should have had control over the "industry and community". He wrote in Socialist Lawyer that "Karl Marx was, of course, right" in saying it was pointless to believe a change of society could only be achieved by arguing about fundamental rights.

Gavin Millar, a former legal colleague of Starmer, has described his politics as "red-green", a characterisation Starmer has agreed with. In a January 2020 interview, Starmer described himself as a socialist, and stated in an opinion piece published by The Guardian the same month that his advocacy of socialism is motivated by "a burning desire to tackle inequality and injustice".

In an interview with the is Francis Elliott in December 2021, Starmer refused to characterise himself as a socialist as he seeks to move Labour to the political centre for a possible next UK general election in 2023, asking "What does that mean?" He added: "The Labour Party is a party that believes that we get the best from each other when we come together, collectively, and ensure that you know, we give people both opportunity and support as they needed."

In 2022, Starmer confirmed that he was no longer making the ten socialism-based pledges that he had made in the 2020 party leadership contest.

Domestic issues 
Starmer supports social ownership and investment in the UK's public services, including the National Health Service (NHS), as well as the abolition of university tuition fees. He has called for an increase in income tax for the top 5% of earners and an end to tax avoidance by corporations. He advocates the reversal of the Conservative Party's cuts in corporation tax and supported Labour's anti-austerity proposals under Jeremy Corbyn's leadership. On social inequality, Starmer proposes "national wellbeing indicators" to measure the country's performance on health, inequality, homelessness, and the environment. He has called for an "overhaul" of the UK's Universal Credit scheme. Opposing Scottish independence and a second referendum on the subject, the Labour Party under Starmer's leadership has set up a constitutional convention to address what he describes as a belief among people across the UK that "decisions about me should be taken closer to me." Starmer is against the reunification of Ireland, having stated that he would be "very much on the side of Unionists" if there were to be a border poll.

On education, Starmer, who benefited from a private school charity himself, vowed in 2021 to strip independent schools of their charitable status, a move that has been criticised by the Independent Schools Council, and he repeated the pledge in July 2022.

In the 2020 Labour Party leadership election, Starmer ran on a pledge to renationalise rail, mail, water, and energy back into common ownership; he dropped this pledge in July 2022. In 2022 speeches, Starmer criticised the Conservative government and vowed to restore trust in government if he came to power. He described the Labour Party as "deeply patriotic" and cited its most successful leaders, Clement Attlee, Harold Wilson, and Tony Blair, for policies "rooted in the everyday concerns of working people". Starmer advocates a government based on "security, prosperity and respect". He wants crime reduced, maintaining that "too many people do not feel safe in their streets". Starmer favours partnership between government and business, having said: "A political party without a clear plan for making sure businesses are successful and growing ... which doesn't want them to do well and make a profit ... has no hope of being a successful government."  Starmer wants to replace the House of Lords with an elected second chamber, Starmer maintains the Conservatives have too often given peerages to ‘lackeys and donors‘.

Foreign affairs 

Starmer has advocated an end to "illegal wars" and a review of the UK arms export. During his leadership campaign, he pledged to create a "Prevention of Military Intervention Act", which would only permit lawful military action with the support of the House of Commons. Starmer stated in 2015 that he believed that the Iraq War was "not lawful under international law because there was no UN resolution expressly authorising it." Starmer called for sanctions against Chinese officials who have been involved in human rights abuses. He criticised the United Kingdom's involvement in the Saudi Arabian–led intervention in Yemen, saying that "it is Boris Johnson and his government who have signed off on the sale of billions of pounds of fighter jets, bombs and missiles, weapons that have destroyed civilian infrastructure, targeted schools and hospitals, and fuelled the humanitarian crisis that Yemen faces. The government must face up to its complicity in this crisis, and we must all talk about Yemen." Starmer condemned the assassination of Qasem Soleimani and said the world needed to "engage, not isolate" Iran and warned that "all sides need to de-escalate tensions and prevent further conflict."

Starmer was previously an advocate for a second Brexit referendum after the process of the UK withdrawal from the EU was completed; in 2021, he ruled out a return to free movement with the EU or substantial renegotiation of the EU–UK Trade and Cooperation Agreement if Labour won the next UK general election. Of the United States as it transitioned from the presidency of Donald Trump to that of Joe Biden, he said: "I'm anti-Trump but I'm pro-American. And I'm incredibly optimistic about the new relationship we can build with President Biden." He argued that "Britain is at its strongest" when it is "the bridge between the US and the rest of Europe." Starmer said that Israel "must respect international law" and called on the Israeli government to work with leaders of Palestine to de-escalate the Israeli–Palestinian conflict. Starmer opposes illegal Israeli settlements, proposals for Israeli annexation of the West Bank, and "the eviction of Palestinians" in the Israeli-occupied territories; he also opposes the Palestinian-led Boycott, Divestment and Sanctions (BDS) movement promoting boycotts, divestments, and economic sanctions against Israel. Starmer also has expressed support for the creation of an "inverse OPEC" dedicated to accelerating the implementation of renewable energy.

During the 2021–2022 Russo-Ukrainian crisis, Starmer held a meeting with NATO General Secretary Jens Stoltenberg and said in an interview with the BBC that his predecessor Jeremy Corbyn was "wrong" to be a critic of NATO and that the Labour Party's commitment to the alliance was "unshakeable". He elaborated on this point that he felt it was "important for me to make clear that we stand united in the UK ... Whatever challenges we have with the [Boris Johnson's] government, when it comes to Russian aggression we stand together." He said Russia should be hit with "widespread and hard-hitting" economic sanctions. He also criticised the Stop the War Coalition in an opinion piece for The Guardian arguing that they were "not benign voices for peace" but rather "[a]t best they are naive, at worst they actively give succour to authoritarian leaders" such as Vladimir Putin "who directly threaten democracies."

Starmer supports maintaining the UK's nuclear arsenal as the nuclear deterrent, and voted for renewal of the Trident program; he supports the general post-Cold War British policy of a gradual reduction in nuclear stockpiles.

Personal life 
Starmer married Victoria Alexander in 2007. She was previously a solicitor but now works in NHS occupational health. The couple's son and daughter are being brought up in the Jewish faith of their mother. Starmer himself stated he does not believe in God but does "believe in faith" and its power to bring people together. Starmer is a keen footballer, having played for Homerton Academicals, a north London amateur team, and supports Premier League side Arsenal.

Starmer is a vegetarian, believing that "it's better for yourself and for the environment".

Awards and honours 

 Appointed Queen's Counsel (QC) in 2002.
 Bar Council's Sydney Elland Goldsmith Award in 2005 for his outstanding contribution to pro bono work in challenging the death penalty in Uganda, Kenya, Malawi, and the Caribbean.
 Honorary Fellow of St Edmund Hall, Oxford.
 Appointed Knight Commander of the Order of the Bath (KCB) in the 2014 New Year Honours for "services to law and criminal justice". 
 Sworn into the Privy Council of the United Kingdom on 19 July 2017. This enabled him to be styled "The Right Honourable".

Publications 
Starmer is the author and editor of several books about criminal law and human rights, including:
 Justice in Error (1993), edited with Clive Walker, London: Blackstone, .
 The Three Pillars of Liberty: Political Rights and Freedoms in the United Kingdom (1996), with Francesca Klug and Stuart Weir, London: Routledge, .
 Signing Up for Human Rights: The United Kingdom and International Standards (1998), with Conor Foley, London: Amnesty International United Kingdom, .
 Miscarriages of Justice: A Review of Justice in Error (1999), edited with Clive Walker, London: Blackstone, .
 European Human Rights Law: the Human Rights Act 1998 and the European Convention on Human Rights (1999), London: Legal Action Group, .
 Criminal Justice, Police Powers and Human Rights (2001), with Anthony Jennings, Tim Owen, Michelle Strange, and Quincy Whitaker, London: Blackstone, .
 Blackstone's Human Rights Digest (2001), with Iain Byrne, London: Blackstone, .
 A Report on the Policing of the Ardoyne Parades 12 July 2004 (2004), with Jane Gordon, Belfast: Northern Ireland Policing Board.

See also 
 The Starmer Project

References

Further reading

External links 

 
 
 
 CPS
 

|-

|-

|-

|-

 
1962 births
20th-century English lawyers
21st-century English lawyers
Alumni of St Edmund Hall, Oxford
Alumni of the University of Leeds
British social democrats
Directors of Public Prosecutions (England and Wales)
English King's Counsel
English socialists
Knights Commander of the Order of the Bath
Labour Party (UK) MPs for English constituencies
Lawyers awarded knighthoods
Leaders of the Labour Party (UK)
Leaders of the Opposition (United Kingdom)
Living people
Members of the Privy Council of the United Kingdom
People educated at Reigate Grammar School
People from Kentish Town
People from Oxted
People from Reigate
21st-century King's Counsel
UK MPs 2015–2017
UK MPs 2017–2019
UK MPs 2019–present
Politicians awarded knighthoods